Trimethoxyphenethylamines (TMPEA) are a group of positional isomers of the psychedelic cactus alkaloid mescaline. Some of them are described in the book PiHKAL by Alexander Shulgin and Ann Shulgin.

 2,3,4-trimethoxyphenethylamine (Isomescaline)
 2,3,5-trimethoxyphenethylamine (2C-TMA-4)
 2,3,6-trimethoxyphenethylamine (2C-TMA-5)
 2,4,5-trimethoxyphenethylamine (2C-O)
 2,4,6-trimethoxyphenethylamine (2C-TMA-6)
 3,4,5-trimethoxyphenethylamine (Mescaline)
 
Psychedelic phenethylamines